Lycée Français International de Panama is a French international school in the Panama Pacifico development in Veracruz, Arraiján District, Panama.  It serves infant school through the final year of senior high school.

External links
 Lycée Français Paul Gauguin de Panamá 
 Lycée Français Paul Gauguin de Panamá 
 Ecole Lycée Français Paul Gauguin de Panamá  (Archive)

Panama
International schools in Panama
Educational institutions with year of establishment missing